Gollinglith Foot, historically also spelt Gownley Foot, is a hamlet in the civil parish of Healey in the Harrogate district of North Yorkshire, England. It lies on the River Burn near the foot of Colsterdale.

Gollinglith Foot was once a thriving mining community.  Iron, lead and coal have all been mined from the area. It once had its own school, founded in 1787.

The Six Dales Trail passes through the hamlet.

References

External links

Villages in North Yorkshire